Zaarour  (Arabic: زعرور ; Syriac: ܥܙܪܪܬܐ ) is a ski resort on the eastern slopes of Mount Sannine in the Matn District of Mount Lebanon Governorate, only 35 km from Beirut. The resort lies north of the mountain village of Mrouj. The name is the Arabic word for hawthorn, which in itself is a corruption of a Syriac word.  

The highest elevation difference at the resort is 355 m.  The resort introduced Handiski (a portmanteau of "handicap" and "ski") which provides specialist adaptive skiing to assist people with a disability or restricted mobility the opportunity to enjoy the pleasures of skiing.

Gallery

References

Geography of Lebanon
Ski areas and resorts in Lebanon
Sport in Lebanon